Robert Jennings (born 2 January 1996) is a Tongan international rugby league footballer who plays as a er and  for the Dolphins in the NRL.

He previously played for the Panthers, South Sydney Rabbitohs and the Wests Tigers in the National Rugby League.

Background
Jennings was born in Blacktown, New South Wales, Australia to Tongan-born parents. He is also of Fijian and English descent. Jennings is the younger brother of former Parramatta Eels player Michael Jennings and Melbourne Storm player George Jennings, and nephew of 1960s All Black Arthur Jennings.

He played his junior football for the Western City Tigers & Minchinbury Jets, before being signed by the Penrith Panthers.

Playing career

Early career
In 2014, Jennings played for the Penrith Panthers' NYC team. In November and December 2014, he played for the Australian Schoolboys. In 2015, he moved on to the Panthers' New South Wales Cup team.

2015
In round 7 of the 2015 NRL season, Jennings made his NRL debut for Penrith against the Gold Coast Titans. On 2 May 2015, he played for the Junior Kangaroos against Junior Kiwis. On 8 July 2015, he played for the New South Wales Under-20s team against the Queensland Under-20s team. At the time, he was contracted with Penrith until the end of 2016.

2016
Jennings was named in Penrith's squad for the 2016 NRL Auckland Nines.

After not receiving any game time in the 2016 NRL season, Jennings signed a one-year contract with the South Sydney Rabbitohs starting in 2017. In September, he was named at centre in the 2016 NYC Team of the Year.

2017
Jennings was named in South Sydney's squad for the 2017 NRL Auckland Nines. He made his South Sydney debut against the Manly-Warringah Sea Eagles in round 2, scoring a try and setting one up for teammate Robbie Farah.

2018
In round 3 of the 2018 NRL season, Jennings scored his first hat trick try for South Sydney in the 34-6 win over the Manly-Warringah Sea Eagles at ANZ Stadium. In round 14 he scored 4 tries in the club's 42-24 smashing of the Parramatta Eels at ANZ Stadium.  Jennings finished off the 2018 season with 19 tries.

2019
On 21 February Jennings signed a two-year deal with the Wests Tigers after he was released by South Sydney.

Jennings made a total of 18 appearances for the Wests Tigers in the 2019 NRL season as the club finished ninth on the table and missed out on the finals.

2020 & 2021
On 28 September, Jennings was one of eight players who were released by the Wests Tigers.
On 30 October 2020, Jennings returned to Penrith on a one-year deal.  Jennings made only three appearances for Penrith in the 2021 NRL season mainly filling in during the State of Origin period.

2022
In May, Jennings signed a contract for two years to join the newly admitted Dolphins (NRL) side ahead of the 2023 NRL season.
Jennings only played four NRL games for the year and spent the majority of his time playing for Penrith's NSW Cup team.  Jennings played for Penrith in their 2022 NSW Cup Grand Final victory over Canterbury.
On 2 October, Jennings played in Penrith's 44-10 victory over Norths Devils in the NRL State Championship final.

References

External links

Penrith Panthers profile
Wests Tigers profile
South Sydney Rabbitohs profile
Rabbitohs profile
Panthers profile

1996 births
Living people
Australian people of English descent
Australian people of Fijian descent
Australian sportspeople of Tongan descent
Australian rugby league players
Penrith Panthers players
Rugby league centres
Rugby league players from Blacktown
Rugby league wingers
South Sydney Rabbitohs players
Tonga national rugby league team players
Wests Tigers players